Microtubule-associated protein 1B is a protein that in humans is encoded by the MAP1B gene.

Function 

This gene encodes a protein that belongs to the microtubule-associated protein family. The proteins of this family are thought to be involved in microtubule assembly, which is an essential step in neurogenesis. The product of this gene is a precursor polypeptide that presumably undergoes proteolytic processing to generate the final MAP1B heavy chain and LC1 light chain. Gene knockout studies of the mouse microtubule-associated protein 1B gene suggested an important role in development and function of the nervous system. Two alternatively spliced transcript variants have been described.

Interactions 

MAP1B has been shown to interact with Acidic leucine-rich nuclear phosphoprotein 32 family member A and RASSF1.

References

Further reading